Harrie Holland Dadmun (1894-1980) was an American stockbroker and professional football player.

Early life
Dadmun was born on June 25, 1894, in Cambridge, Massachusetts. He played college football at Tufts College. After two years, he transferred to Harvard University. In 1916, he was elected the captain of Harvard squad. That year, Dadmun was named first-team All-American by Walter Camp, Walter Eckersall, and Fielding H. Yost and second-team All-American by the United Press and International News Service. He graduated in 1917 and joined the United States Navy. He served in France during World War I and was discharged with the rank of ensign.

Professional football
Dadmun spent two years of the American Professional Football Association, the forerunner to the National Football League, with the Canton Bulldogs and the New York Brickley Giants.

Business career
In 1930, Dadmun co-founded the stock brokerage firm of Lang and Dadmun. He was the firm's president until his retirement in the 1970s.

Personal life
Dadmun resided in Arlington for many years. He was chairman of the town's school committee. In 1950, he moved to Lincoln, Massachusetts. He died on September 15, 1980, at Emerson Hospital in Concord, Massachusetts.

References

1894 births
1980 deaths
American football guards
Canton Bulldogs players
Harvard Crimson football players
New York Brickley Giants players
Tufts Jumbos football players
Sportspeople from Cambridge, Massachusetts
Players of American football from Massachusetts
People from Arlington, Massachusetts
People from Lincoln, Massachusetts
Sportspeople from Middlesex County, Massachusetts